The 2021 Premier Volleyball League Open Conference was the tenth conference of the Premier Volleyball League (37th conference of the former Shakey's V-League) and its first conference as a professional league. The conference started on July 17, 2021 and ended on August 13, 2021, at the PCV Socio-Civic and Cultural Center in Bacarra, Ilocos Norte in a bubble. The PVL has been approved by the Inter-Agency Task Force for the Management of Emerging Infectious Diseases (IATF-EID) to begin team practices to be followed by the official start of the 2021 season.

In January 2021, it was reported that Motolite filed a leave of absence from the league and released all of its players. The Philippine Army Lady Troopers will participate as a guest team. 

Five teams from Philippine Super Liga joined the PVL – Cignal HD Spikers, PLDT Home Fibr Power Hitters, Chery Tiggo Crossovers, Sta. Lucia Lady Realtors and F2 Logistics Cargo Movers. On July 9, 2021, F2 Logistics announced it will not participate in the Open Conference citing injuries and lack of training due to difficulties maintaining their training bubble.

A newly-established team, the UAC Power Hitters, joined the league but announced in June that it will not compete in the Open Conference as it has not formed a team in time for the conference.

Participating teams

Venue 
The 2021 Premier Volleyball League Open Conference held its first game at the Centennial Arena in Laoag, Ilocos Norte as an isolation zone (bubble). But since Laoag is under Modified Enhanced Community Quarantine days before the tournament, teams temporarily moved the venue to PCV Socio-Civic and Cultural Center in Bacarra, Ilocos Norte. The conference began July 17, 2021, the bubble accommodated 11 teams.

The original schedule of the 2021 bubble was supposed to be in February or March. Ricky Palou, president of Sports Vision Management (organizers of the PVL), said that they did not want to compete with basketball as the Samahang Basketbol ng Pilipinas is having an international tournament in February. Philippine men's basketball team will hold practices and will compete for the February window of the 2021 FIBA Asia Cup qualification to be held also at the Inspire Sports Academy.

Cignal TV will be the official broadcast partner under a 3-year contract.

Training venues 
The following venues served as the training ground of the PVL teams as approved by the Games and Amusements Board (GAB).

Transactions

National team players 
The following players were part of the national team that competed in 2019 international games.

Team additions and transfers
The following are the players who transferred to another team on the upcoming conference.

Preliminary round

Ranking

|}

Match results 
All times are Philippine Standard Time (UTC+8:00).
|}

Final round 
 All times are Philippine Standard Time (UTC+8:00).

 All series are best-of-three.

Brackets

Semifinals 
Rank 1 vs Rank 4
 Creamline wins series, 2–0

|}

Rank 2 vs Rank 3
 Chery Tiggo wins series, 2–1
|}

Finals 
3rd place match
 Petro Gazz wins series, 2–0

|}

Championships
 Chery Tiggo wins series, 2–1

|}

Awards and medalists

Individual awards

Medalists

Final standings

Asian Club Championship
The best performing team were invited to take part at the 2021 Asian Women's Club Volleyball Championship. All teams declined to participate.
 The club which would have accepted the invitation would have to shoulder the associated fees for their participation. A national team side was entered in the club tournament instead.

Statistics leaders
Here are the statistical leaders at the end of the 2021 Premier Volleyball League Open Conference. Note that the list only consists of the players from the final four teams.

Best scorers

Best spikers

Best blockers

Best servers

Best diggers

Best setters

Best receivers

PVLPC player of the week

References 

2021 in Philippine sport
PVL
PVL